Amorphophallus maximus is a species of subtropical tuberous herbaceous plant found in Tanzania and Zimbabwe.

References

External links
 
 

maximus
Taxa named by N. E. Brown
Taxa named by Adolf Engler